Brian Wilson (10 November 1925 – 24 September 1984) was an  Australian rules footballer who played with Geelong in the Victorian Football League (VFL).

Notes

External links 

1925 births
1984 deaths
Australian rules footballers from Victoria (Australia)
Geelong Football Club players